Marshall Chin is an American physician who is the Richard Parrillo Family Professor of Healthcare Ethics at the University of Chicago. He is also the Associate Director of the University of Chicago's MacLean Center for Clinical Medical Ethics and Senior Faculty Scholar at the Bucksbaum Institute for Clinical Excellence.

He received his BA from Harvard College in 1985 and his MD from University of California San Francisco School of Medicine in 1989; as well as an MPH from Harvard University in 1994.

His major research is on improving shared decision making among health professionals and LGBTQ racial/ethnic minority patients. He has led investigations on health disparities in diabetes care in health centers serving vulnerable populations with limited assets.

Selected awards and honors

 2017  National Academy of Medicine
 2014-5 president-elect  of the  Society of General Internal Medicine

References 

American ethicists
Living people
Year of birth missing (living people)
University of California, San Francisco alumni
Harvard School of Public Health alumni
Harvard College alumni
21st-century American physicians
20th-century American physicians
University of Chicago faculty
Members of the National Academy of Medicine